Buddhasvamin may refer to:
 Buddhasvamin (monk), a Kuchean Hinayana Buddhist monk and great scholar who presided over all of Kucha's Buddhist temples and nunneries during part of the fourth century
 Buddhasvamin (writer), an Indian writer who compiled the Shlokasanggraha, a famous Indian katha narrative, around 800-900AD